Personal Injuries is a novel by Scott Turow which was published in 1999. Like all of Turow's novels (bar his autobiographies), it takes place in fictional Kindle County and many of the characters are recognized from other Turow novels.

Plot
The novel begins with Robbie Feaver seeking advice from attorney George Mason, the narrator. Feaver admits that he has been bribing several judges in the Common Law Claims Division to win favorable judgments for years. U.S. Attorney Stan Sennett has uncovered Feaver's secret and wants Feaver to strike a deal to get at the man he believes to be at the center of all the legal corruption in the metropolitan area, Brendan Tuohey, the Presiding Judge of Common Law Claims and heir apparent to the Chief Justice of Kindle County Superior Court. An undercover scheme is put in motion to trap the guilty parties. The novel follows the FBI as it pursues the legal community of Kindle County in a web of tapped phones, concealed cameras, and wired spies.

Awards
Time Magazine named Personal Injuries as the Best Fiction Novel of 1999.

Kindle County
1999 American novels
Novels by Scott Turow
Farrar, Straus and Giroux books